The Green Party (SZ) leadership election of 2005 was held on 24 September 2005. Martin Bursík became the new Leader of the Party when he defeated Karel Helman. Bursík's only competition was Karel Helman. Election was held after previous leader Jan Beránek was removed from the position of Leader. Beránek himself decided to not run.

Voting
There were only 2 Candidates. Martin Bursík was viewed as a clear front runner as Karl Helman's candidacy was viewed as a recession. Helman himself admitted during nomination Speech that he doesn't have an Ambition to become party's leader. 147 Delegates voted. Bursík received 114 votes against Helman's 17 votes and was elected.

References

Green Party (Czech Republic) leadership elections
Green Party leadership election
Green Party (Czech Republic) leadership election
Indirect elections
Green Party (Czech Republic) leadership election